Sorting nexin-9 is a protein that in humans is encoded by the SNX9 gene.

This gene encodes a member of the sorting nexin family. Members of this family contain a phox (PX) domain, which is a phosphoinositide binding domain, and are involved in intracellular trafficking. This protein does not contain a coiled coil region, like some family members, but does contain an SH3 domain near its N-terminus. This protein interacts with the cytoplasmic domains of the precursor but not the processed forms of a disintegrin and metalloprotease domain 9 and 15. This protein binds the beta-appendage domain of adaptor protein 2 and may function to assist adaptor protein 2 in its role at the plasma membrane. This protein interacts with activated Cdc42-associated kinase-2 to regulate the degradation of epidermal growth factor receptor protein.

Interactions
SNX9 has been shown to interact with ADAM9, DNM2 and ADAM15.

References

Further reading